Goddard Memorial State Park is a public recreation area occupying  along the shores of Greenwich Cove and Greenwich Bay in Warwick, Rhode Island. The state park grounds were once the estate of Civil War officer and Rhode Island politician Robert Goddard, whose children gave the land to the state in 1927 as a memorial to their father.

References

External links

Goddard Memorial State Park Rhode Island Department of Environmental Management Division of Parks & Recreation
Goddard Memorial State Park Map Rhode Island Department of Environmental Management Division of Parks & Recreation

State parks of Rhode Island
Protected areas of Kent County, Rhode Island
Warwick, Rhode Island
Protected areas established in 1927
1927 establishments in Rhode Island
Civilian Conservation Corps in Rhode Island